Corapipo is a genus of birds in the manakin family Pipridae that are found in Central America and northern parts of South America.

Taxonomy
The genus Corapipo was introduced by the French naturalist Charles Lucien Bonaparte in 1854 with the white-throated manakin as the type species.

The genus contains three species:
 White-throated manakin (Corapipo gutturalis)
 White-ruffed manakin (Corapipo altera) Sometimes treated as a subspecies of C. leucorrhoa.
 White-bibbed manakin (Corapipo leucorrhoa)

References

 
Pipridae
Bird genera
Taxa named by Charles Lucien Bonaparte
Taxonomy articles created by Polbot